Ralph Basset (died 1127) was an English royal justice.

Ralph Basset may also refer to:

Ralph Basset (died 1265), English baronial leader
Ralph Basset (died 1282), English baronial leader
Ralph Basset, 1st Lord Basset of Drayton (died 1299)
Ralph Basset, 2nd Baron Basset of Drayton (died 1343)
Ralph Basset, 3rd Baron Basset of Drayton (died 1390)